The Wayne Morse Family Farm, a City of Eugene park, was the home of Oregon's long-time United States Senator, Wayne Morse.  The  home is located in Eugene, Oregon and was originally a working farm called Edgewood Farm. Owned by the Morse family, it includes the Morse home, a natural wooded area, and an  open meadow. Formerly named Morse Ranch, the park is listed on the National Register of Historic Places.

Wayne Morse  

Wayne Lyman Morse was a law professor and independent-minded politician from Oregon.  He was born in Wisconsin, but moved to Eugene in 1930, where he taught law at the University of Oregon.  In 1944, Morse was elected to the United States Senate as a Republican.  In 1952, he left the Republican Party, becoming an Independent.  Three years later, Morse joined the Democratic Party.  Morse continued to serve in the Senate until 1968.  He died in Portland, Oregon, in 1974.

Morse house 

The Morse house, a colonial revival style home designed by Wallace Hayden, was built in 1936. The house is a standard wood-frame structure with shingle siding on a concrete foundation.  The interior is furnished with period furniture from the 1930s and 1940s that help preserve the historic integrity of the home.  Morse memorabilia is also on display in the house.  This includes a small collection of copies of political cartoons featuring Wayne Morse, which were donated to him by the artists.  The original collection is maintained by the Oregon Historical Society in Portland.  Because of its importance to the political history of Oregon, the Morse house and surrounding park were listed on the National Register of Historic Places in 1999.

The historic house is open to the public by appointment and can be rented for small events.  The Wayne Morse Historical Park Corporation works with the City of Eugene to preserve the Morse house and park.  Members of the group give tours, organize events, and maintain the Morse collection exhibits.

Morse Family Farm 

In addition to the house, the  park includes a natural wooded area and meadow.  Originally, it was a working farm the Morse family called Edgewood Farm. Today, it is a City of Eugene park with open space, restrooms, picnic tables, and a large picnic shelter, which is available for rent from May through October.  When the shelter is not reserved, it is open to the public.

The park grounds are open daily from dawn until 9:30 pm, with nature walks being  a popular attraction.  Dogs are permitted in the fenced off-leash dog exercise area.  In the summer, the City of Eugene operates a day camp in the park.  The Willamette Wildlife Rehabilitation Center, which is not affiliated with the Wayne Morse Family Farm, is also located on the grounds of the park.  The center rehabilitates injured birds and small animals.

References

External links 
Wayne Morse Family Farm - City of Eugene, Oregon
Museums of Springfield/Eugene
Wayne Morse Historical Park Corporation
Willamette Wildlife Rehabilitation

Houses completed in 1936
Houses on the National Register of Historic Places in Eugene, Oregon
1936 establishments in Oregon
Parks in Eugene, Oregon
Farms on the National Register of Historic Places in Oregon